Tucker Creek is a stream in Madison County in the U.S. state of Missouri. It is a tributary of Castor River.

Tucker Creek has the name of Francis Marion Tucker, a pioneer settler.

See also
List of rivers of Missouri

References

Rivers of Madison County, Missouri
Rivers of Missouri